Love Go Go!! is an album recorded by female Japanese pop artist Watanabe Misato. It was released on July 19, 2000 by Sony Music Entertainment.

Track listing 
"Love Go Go!!"
"Lovers universe"
"Anata no Suki na Uta" ("Your favorite song")
"Motto Touku he..." ("Further away...")
"Kobushi" ("Fist")
"Tatta Ichido no Jinsei damono" ("Well, Just once Life")
"Lazy sunny afternoon"
"Araburu Mune no Shinbaru Narase" ("Hit the Cymbal of my Careless Heart")
"Izayoino tsuki" ("A Moon Sixteen days old")
"Home Run, run, run"
"Thank you"
"Shin-Kokyu" ("Deep Breath")

External links 
Sony Music Entertainment - Official site for Watanabe Misato. 
Album Page - Direct link to page with song listing and music samples.

2000 albums
Misato Watanabe albums
Sony Music albums